Sengor is a town in Mongar District in northeastern Bhutan.

References

Populated places in Bhutan
Mongar District